This is a list of Italian carracks, galleons and ships of the line of the period 1400-1858:
Italy was formed in 1861 with the union of several states, including the Two Sicilies (with Naples), and Piedmont-Sardinia, including Genoa, some Papal states and Tuscany. Later, Venice and Rome joined. Several of these states had their own naval forces. An * after a name indicates that that ship survived until 1861 and was incorporated into the Regia Marina.

Genoa
Sancta Maria & Sancta Brigida - Captured by England 1409, renamed Le Carake
? - Captured by England 1416, renamed George, to Venice 1424
? - Captured by England 1416, renamed Marie Hampton
? - Captured by England 1416, renamed Marie Sandwich
Galeas Negre - Captured by England 1417, renamed Andrew
Pynele - Captured by England 1417, renamed Christopher, sold 1423
? - Captured by England 1417, renamed Peter
Vivande - Captured by England 1417, renamed Paul
? - Captured by England c. 1417, renamed Agase, wrecked on mudflats c. 1418
At Battle of Lepanto:
Left wing
Marchesa
Fortuna
Center
Capitana
Padrona
Capitana (Lomellini family)
Padrona (Lomellini family)
Capitana (Grimaldi family)
Doria
Perla
Temperanza
Vittoria
Right wing
Capitana (Gian Andrea Doria)
Donzella
Monarca 
Capitana (Nicolò Doria)
Padrona
Capitana (Negroni family)
Padrona (Negroni family)
Negrona
Bastarda
Padrona (Lomellini family)
Furia
Padrona (Grimaldi family)
Padrona (De Mari family)
Diana
Rearguard
Baccana
San Bartolomeo
The 18th century
? (1695, ex-French Cumberland, sold 1715, ex-British Cumberland 80, captured 1707) - Sold to Spain 1717, captured by Britain at the Battle of Cape Passaro 1718, sold to Austria 1720, renamed San Carlos, BU 1733
? (ex-French, sold 1711, ex-British Gloucester 60, captured 1709) - Sold to Spain 1720, renamed Conquistador, Stricken 1738

Naples/Two Sicilies

Under Charles III
San Filippo la Reale 64 - ship of the line
San Carlo la Partenope 50 - frigate
Regina 40 - frigate
Concezione 40 - frigate
Santa Amalia 40 - frigate
San Gennaro 20 - xebec
San Pasquale 20 - xebec
San Ferdinando 20 - xebec
San Gabriele 20 - xebec
San Luigi 20 - xebec
San Antonio 20 - xebec
Capitana 3 - galley
Sant'Antonio 3 - galley
Patrona 3 - galley
San Gennaro 3 - galley
Under Ferdinand I
San Giovanni 60-66 (1768/69, transferred from Malta 1781/84)
San Gioacchino 70 (1769/70, transferred from Malta 1781/84)
Partenope 74 - sank on the night between 8 and 9 January 1799 at the mouth of the harbor of Castellammare di Stabia for make it unfit for occupation by the French.
Tancredi 74 - burnt in 1799 for preventing capture
Guiscardo 74 - burnt for preventing capture in 1799
Archimede 74 - broken up in 1813
Sannita 74 - broken up in 1802
Ruggiero 60 - ship of the line
Aretusa 41 - frigate, broken up in 1815
Minerva 38- frigate, the ship where Nelson hanged up the Admiral Caracciolo
Sibilla 38 - frigate, broken up in 1815
Cerere 38 - frigate
Aurora 38 - corvette, broken up in 1842
Fortuna 30 - corvette, broken up in 1815
Fama 28 - corvette, broken up in 1823
Stabia 24 - corvette, sold to a private in 1820
Flora 24 - corvette, burnt in 1799 for preventing capture
Galatea 24 - corvette, broken up in 1836
Napoleonic period
Capri 84 - ship of the line, broken up in 1847
Gioacchino 80 - ship of the line, renamed San Ferdinando, broken up after a fire in 1821
Carolina* 52 - frigate, renamed Amalia in 1815 and Caracciolo in 1861, broken up in 1866
Vesuvio* 87 - reclassified corvette in the 1861 and demolished in 1865
Under Francis I
Regina Isabella* 46 - frigate, broken up in 1864
Francesco I* 32 - corvette, ex royal yacht, converted in warship and renamed Cristina in 1831, broken up in 1866.
Principe Carlo* 20 - brig, renamed Tronto in 1860 and broken up in 1866
Under Ferdinand II
Monarca* 84 - steam battleship, renamed Re Galantuomo and broken up in 1875
Farnese* 70 - steam frigate, captured while still in construction and renamed Italia
Urania 46 - sail frigate
Regina* 40 - steam frigate, broken up in 1872
Partenope* 40 - sail frigate, converted in steam frigate in 1862 and broken up in 1869
Etna 25 - corvette, broken up in 1859
Generoso* 20 - brig, broken up in 1864
Intrepido* 20 - brig, broken up in 1870
Veloce* 18 - paddle frigate, ex steam cruise ship used by the Sicilian revolutionaries in 1848 as the Indipendenza, captured by the Borbonic navy and renamed Veloce, captured again by the troops of Garibaldi in 1860 and renamed Tukery, scrapped in 1899
Valoroso* 18 - sail corvette, broken up in 1870
Zeffiro* 18 - sail corvette, broken up in 1870
Sannita 12 - paddle frigate, sold while on repair in France in 1860
Torquato Tasso 12 - paddle frigate, sunk in a storm in 1860
Carlo III 10 - paddle frigate, exploded after a fire in 1857
Fulminante* 10 - paddle frigate, ex English merchant ship used by the Sicilian revolutionaries as the Ruggero Settimo, captured by the Borbonic navy and renamed Fulminante, broken up in 1873
Stromboli* 8 - paddle corvette, broken up in 1866
Ettore Fieramosca* 6 - paddle frigate, broken up in 1896
Ferdinando II* 6 - paddle corvette, renamed Stabia in 1860 and broken up in 1864
Sirena* 5 - paddle aviso, broken up in 1911 
Aquila* 4 - paddle aviso, broken up in 1875
Maria Teresa* 4 - paddle aviso, renamed Principessa Clotilde in 1860 and Garigliano in 1861, broken up in 1864
Peloro* 4 - paddle aviso, broken up in 1876
Delfino* 4 - paddle aviso, decommissioned in 1863
Two Ercole-class paddle frigates* 10 - Ercole and Archimede
Four Ruggiero-class paddle frigates* 10 - Ruggiero, Roberto, Guiscardo
Two Palinuro-class paddle corvettes* 8 - Palinuro and Miseno
Under Francis II
Borbone* 59 - steam frigate, renamed Giuseppe Garibaldi, renamed Saati and ceded to the Eritrean colonial administration in 1893, serving as hospital ship until 1899
Gaeta* 54 - steam frigate, captured while still in construction, broken up in 1876
Etna* 18 - steam corvette, captured while still in construction, decommissioned in 1875

Papal States
At Battle of Lepanto (1571):
 Capitana ("flagship")
 Padrona ("squadron flagship")
 Suprema (Supreme)
 Serena (Serene)
 Pace (Peace)
 Vittoria (Victoria)
 Grifona (Gryphon)
 Santa Maria
 San Giovanni
 Regina (Queen)
 San Bonaventura (St. Bonaventure)
  14 - Ex HMS Speedy, an earlier brig gifted to the Pope by Napoleon and broken up in 1807
 San Pietro (1823) a schooner
 Roma, a steamer used during the events of the Roman Republic against the Austrians
 Immacolata Concezione* (Immaculate Conception), a steam corvette

Tuscany
At Battle of Lepanto:
Capitana
Grifona
Toscana
Pisana
Pace
Vittoria
Fiorenza
San Giovanni
Santa Maria
Serena
Elbigina
The fleet in 1604
Capitana
Padrona
Fiorenza
Santa Maria
Siena
Pisana
Livornina
The fleet in 1611
Padrona vecchia
Santa Maria
Magdalena
San Cosimo
Capitana
Santa Margherita
San Francesco
San Carlo
Santa Cristina
Padrona
The 17th century
? (ex-Algerian Star 50, captured 1695)
Ships of the line hired in the 18th century
San Lorenzo 50-60
Fenice 50-60
Porco Spino 50-60
Burlando 50-60
The 19th century
Ardita* - steam gunboat
Curtatone* - steam gunboat
Palestro* - steam gunboat
Veloce* - steam gunboat
Giglio* 2 - sloop
Feritore* - schooner, ceded to the nautical school of Palermo in 1864
Argo* - schooner, ceded to the office for the administration of public works, harbors and lighthouses of Genoa

Piedmont
? - Captured by Spain 1718, renamed San Juan Bautista, wrecked 1719
? - Captured by Spain 1718, renamed Santa Rosa Palermo (Santa Rosalia), scuttled 1719
? - Captured by Spain 1718, renamed Triunfo, scuttled 1719
The fleet in 1860
Vittorio Emanuele* 77 - steam frigate, broken up in 1907
San Michele* 60 - sail frigate, broken up in 1876 
Carlo Alberto* 53 - steam frigate, broken up in 1876
Des Geneys* 48 - sail frigate, broken up in 1870
Euridice* 44 - sail frigate, broken up in 1870
San Giovanni* 34 - steam corvette, broken up in 1878
Aquila* 24 - sail corvette, renamed Iride in 1861 and broken up in 1870
Aurora* 24 - sail corvette, decommissioned in 1866
Eridano* 16 - brig, broken up in 1869
Daino* 16 - brig, broken up in 1905
Colombo* 16 - brig, broken up in 1868
Governolo* 12 - paddle frigate, broken up in 1883
Costituzione* 12 - paddle frigate, broken up in 1878
Staffetta 10 - schooner, broken up in 1862
L'Azzardoso* 8 - brig, broken up in 1866
Monzambano* 4 - paddle corvette, broken up in 1876
Tripoli* 4 -paddle corvette, broken up in 1878
Malfatano* 4 - paddle corvette, broken up in 1871
Authion* 3 - paddle aviso, broken up in 1897
Vinzaglio* - steam gunboat
Six N 1-class steam gunboats* - N 1, N 2, N 3, N 4, N 5, N 6, decommissioned in 1901 
Six Frassineto-class steam gunboats* - Frassineto, Torrione, Castenedolo, Pozzolengo, Adda and Mincio, decommissioned in 1867
Two Gulnara-class avisos* 4 - Gulnara and Ichnusa

Venice
 ? (c. 1529) - The world's first galleon, BU 1547?
 ? - Sank 1558
 ? (1570)
San Giorgio grande
Silvestra (robbed by corsairs on way to Corfu about 1599 - all killed except 3 sailors)  
Madonna della Vigna (c. 1649)
Aquila d'Oro - Burnt in action against the Turks 1654
Giove Fulminante c. 70 (c. 1667) - Discarded 1693?
Costanza Guerriera c. 70 (c. 1667) - Wrecked 1684
Drago Volante c. 60 (c. 1674) - Blew up 1695
Fama Volante 50 (c. 1674) - Discarded 1699?
Madonna della Salute 50 (c. 1675) - Discarded 1714?
Venezia Trionfante c. 60 (1670s) - Wrecked 1684
Venere Armata 52 (1670s/c. 1686) - Discarded 1702?
Ercole Vittorioso 50 (c. 1683) - Discarded 1719?
San Marco Grande 60 (c. 1683) - Blew up 1690
San Antonio di Padova c. 50 (c. 1683) - Discarded 1715?
Pace ed Abbondanza 50 (c. 1683) - Discarded 1714?
San Giovanni Battista Piccolo c. 50 (c. 1683) - Sank 1695
San Vittorio 62 (bought 1684) - Discarded 1706?
San Giovanni Battista Grande 60 (bought 1684) - Discarded 1706?
San Andrea 60 (c. 1685) - Discarded 1721?
San Nicolo 54 (c. 1685) - Discarded 1717?
San Iseppo/San Giuseppe 44 (c. 1685) - Captured by Turkey (or Algeria?) 1690
Redentore del Mundo 70 (c. 1686) - Discarded 1709?
San Domenico 60 (c. 1686) - Discarded 1709?
Vittoria 50 (c. 1687) - Discarded 1717?
Sacra Lega 60 (c. 1687) - Discarded 1720?
Valor Coronato 54 (c. 1687) - Discarded 1719?
Monton d'Oro (c. 1688) - Aground and burnt, 1691
Abbondanza e Richezza (c. 1688) - Abandoned 1695
Nettuno 50 (c. 1690) - Discarded 1722?
Leon Coronato (c. 1691) - Blew up 1695
San Lorenzo Giustinian 80 (c. 1691) - Discarded 1712?
Stella Maris (c. 1693) - Blew up 1695
Rosa 60 (c. 1693) - Discarded 1721?
Fenice 56 (c. 1695) - Discarded 1720?
Fede Guerriera 56 (c. 1695) - Discarded 1720?
Iride 66 (c. 1696) - Discarded 1718?
San Sebastiano 68 (c. 1696) - Blew up 1697
Aurora 80 (c. 1696) - Discarded 1709?
Tigre 66 (c. 1696) - Discarded 1705?
Giove 64 (c. 1697) - Discarded 1717?
Sole d'Oro 70 (c. 1697) - Discarded 1705?
Rizzo d'Oro 68 (c. 1697) - Discarded 1711?
Amazzone Guerriera 62 (c. 1697) - Discarded 1712?
Aquila Volante/Aquilla Valiera c. 70 (c. 1698) - Discarded 1720?
Grand Alessandro c. 70 (c. 1709) - Discarded 1730?
Corona c. 70 (c. 1711) - Discarded 1728?
Croce Rossa c. 70 (c. 1698) - Wrecked 1715
Terror c. 70 (c. 1715) - Discarded 1748?
Regina del Mar c. 70 (c. 1715) - Discarded 1715?
Costanza 76 (c. 1714) - Discarded 1745?
Aquileta c. 60
San Francesco c. 60 (c. 1714) - Discarded 1748?
San Pietro Apostolo c. 60 (bought 1715) - Discarded 1733?
Scudo della Fede c. 50 (c. 1715) - Discarded 1716
Santissimo Crocefisso c. 50
Madonna dell' Arsenal c. 70 (c. 1716) - Discarded 1740?
Venezia Trionfante c. 50 (c. 1715/25) - Discarded 1745?
Leone Trionfante c. 80 (c. 1716) - Discarded 1740?
Gloria Veneta 70-80 (c. 1716) - Discarded 1738?
San Pio V 70-80 (c. 1716) - Discarded 1740?
San Gaetano 70-80 (c. 1716) - Discarded 1733?
Fortuna (Fortezza?) Guerriera (c. 1717) - Discarded 1740?
San Pietro Alcantara (c. 1718) - Discarded 1733?
San Andrea (c. 1718/24) - Discarded 1747?
Idra (c. 1717) - Discarded 1737?
San Zaccaria (c. 1717) - Discarded 1734?
San Spiridon (c. 1717) - Discarded 1736?
Falcon (c. 1717) - Discarded 1738?
Ercole 74 (c. 1761) - Discarded 1779?
Corriera 74 - Wrecked 1771
Concordia 66 (1772) - Discarded 1793?
Diligenza (c. 1774) - Discarded 1797?
Forza 70 (c. 1774) - Wrecked 1785
Sirena c. 60 (c. 1778) - Discarded 1794?
Galatea (c. 1779) - Discarded 1793?
Fama 66 (c. 1784) - Captured by France 1797 and renamed Dubois, BU c. 1801
Vittoria 70 (c. 1784) - Captured by France 1797 and scuttled
Eolo 70 (c. 1785) - Captured by France 1797 and renamed Robert
San Giorgio 70 (c. 1785) - Captured by France 1797 and renamed Sandos
Minerva - Wrecked c. 1792
Vulcano 70 (c. 1792) - Captured by France 1797 and renamed Causse, captured by Britain 1801
Medea 70 (c. 1793) - Captured by France 1797 and renamed Frontin
Gloria (Veneta) 66 (c. 1794) - Captured by France 1797 and renamed Banel
Laharpe 74 (c. 1797) - Captured by France 1797, captured by Austria 1799
Stengal 64 (c. 1797) - Captured by France 1797, captured by Austria 1799
Beyrand 64 (c. 1797) - Captured by France 1797, captured by Austria 1799
(10 ships of the Line) - Captured by France 1797

Notes

Sailing ships of Italy
Sail
Italy
Italy